Ajantha is a village in Aurangabad district, Maharashtra, on the road between Jalgaon and Aurangabad near the Ajanta Caves.

Geography
Ajanta Came to visibility during one war which was unknown to most of the folks out there. Ajanta Village was under the rule of Nizamshahi (Nizam of Ahmednagar) adil shahi until 1634. in 1634 Mughals captured Daulatabad and Khadki- Present day Aurangabad City.

History 
The Ajanta Caves were discovered in 1819 by John Smith during his hunting party in the region, but the village is much more ancient. It has been ruled by many rulers including Nizam Shahi, Mughals, Rajput and Maratha. It is believed that the village came into existence at the end of 3rd century under the Vakataka Empire Vakataka dynasty and was a Brahmin dynasty.

Ajanta became a prominent village for the Mughals after the victory of Shah Jahan in the Siege of Daulatabad Fort in 1632. After the successful campaign, Shah Jahan granted Ajanta village, Vetalwadi and Janjala fort to the Rajput Sardar Nathu Singh son of Maharawal BHIM SINGH of Jaisalmer for his bravery in the war.

References

Villages in Aurangabad district, Maharashtra